There are a number of ways to classify distal radius fractures. Classifications systems are devised to describe patterns of injury which will behave in predictable ways, to distinguish between conditions which have different outcomes or which need different treatments. Most wrist fracture systems have failed to accomplish any of these goals and there is no consensus about the most useful one.

At one extreme, a stable undisplaced extra-articular fracture has an excellent prognosis.  On the other hand, an unstable, displaced intra-articular fracture is difficult to treat and has a poor prognosis without operative intervention.

Eponyms such as Colles', Smith's, and Barton's fractures are discouraged.

Anatomy
An anatomic description of the fracture is the easiest way to describe the fracture, determine treatment, and assess stability.
 Articular incongruity
 Volar or dorsal tilt
 Radial inclination
 Radial length and ulnar variance
 Comminution of the fracture (the amount of crumbling at the fracture site)
 Open (compound fracture) vs. closed injury
 Associated ulnar styloid fracture
 Associated soft tissue injuries

Articular incongruity

The articular joint's surface must be smooth for it to function properly. Irregularity may result in radiocarpal arthritis, pain, and stiffness.  More than 1 mm of incongruity places the patient at a high risk for post-traumatic arthritis. Significant articular incongruity typically occurs in young patients after high energy injuries.  If the surface is very irregular and cannot be reconstructed, then the only option may be a fusion of the joint.

Volar vs dorsal tilt
The angulation goes between:
 A line drawn between the distal ends of the articular surface of the radius on a lateral X-ray.
 A line that is perpendicular to the diaphysis of the radius.
Sometimes, the diaphysis of the radius is hard to distinguish from the ulna, and a line between them ( in image) may be used instead.

The angle normally has volar tilt of 11° to 12°. The most common fracture pattern usually demonstrates malalignment of this angle and collapse in a dorsal direction. A dorsal tilt of 0° (11° - 12° deviation from normal anatomic position) causes a substantial risk of developing pain and impaired function. After closed reduction, a residual dorsal tilt of a maximum of 5° (16° - 17° deviation) is regarded as the maximal residual angle for a satisfactory result.

Radial inclination
The angle is measured between:
 A line drawn between the distal ends of the articular surface of the radius on an AP view of the wrist.
 A line that is perpendicular to the diaphysis of the radius.
Radial inclination is normally 21-25°.

Radial length and ulnar variance
Radial length is an important consideration in distal radius fractures. Radial length should be between 9-12mm. Distal radius fractures typically result in loss of length as the radius collapses from the loading force of the injury.  With increasing relative lengthening of the uninjured ulna (positive ulnar variance), ulnar impaction syndrome may occur. Ulnar impaction syndrome is a painful condition of excessive contact and wear between the ulna and the carpus with an associated is a degenerative tear of the TFCC.

Melone classification
The system that comes closest to directing treatment has been devised by Melone. This system breaks distal radius fractures down into 4 components: radial styloid, dorsal medial fragment, volar medial fragment, and radial shaft. The two medial fragments (which together create the lunate fossa) are grouped together as the medial complex.

Frykman classification
Though the Frykman classification system has traditionally been used, there is little value in its use because it does not help direct treatment. This system focuses on articular and ulnar involvement. The classification is as follows:

Universal classification
The Universal classification system is descriptive but also does not direct treatment.  Universal codes are:

AO/OTA classification 
Widely used system that includes 27 subgroups. Three main groups based on fracture joint involvement (A - extra-articular, B - partial articular, C - complete articular). Classification further defined based on level of comminution and direction of displacement. A qualification (Q) modifier can be added to classify associated ulnar injury.

Fernandez classification 
Simplified system developed in response to AO classification, intended to be based on injury mechanism with more treatment-oriented classifications (treatment suggestions not meant to be used as rigid guidelines but can be used to help decision making on a case-by-case basis)

Note: Associated Lesions include carpal ligament injury, nerve injury, tendon damage, and compartment syndrome

References

Bone fractures
Medical classification